The 1960–61 season was the 58th season of competitive football in Belgium. Standard Liège won their second Division I title. K Lierse SK entered the 1960–61 European Champion Clubs' Cup as Belgian title holder and RU Saint-Gilloise entered the 1960–61 Inter-Cities Fairs Cup. The European Cup Winners' Cup was first played this season but no Belgian club participated since the Belgian Cup had not been played since 1955–56. The Belgium national football team started their qualifying campaign for the 1962 FIFA World Cup by 3 losses and were thus already eliminated at the end of the season with yet one match to be played.

Overview
The Belgium national football team was drawn in Group 1 for the 1962 FIFA World Cup qualification with Sweden and Switzerland. Legendary midfielder Paul Van Himst played his first game with the national team in Sweden for the first game in the qualification, which Belgium lost 2-0. After 2 more losses to Switzerland, Belgium was already eliminated from the World Cup, with one more game to be played during the 1961–62 season.

At the end of the season, RCS Verviétois and VV Patro Eisden were relegated to Division II and were replaced in Division I by KFC Diest and RCS Brugeois from Division II.
The bottom 2 clubs in Division II (RRC de Bruxelles and K Lyra) were relegated to Division III while both Division III winners (ASV Oostende KM and KFC Herentals) qualified for Division II.
The bottom 2 clubs of each Division III league (US Centre, KFC Izegem, R Stade Waremmien FC and K Hasseltse VV) were relegated to the Promotion, to be replaced by Kontich FC, R Albert Elisabeth Club Mons, K Tongerse SV Cercle and KSV Sottegem from Promotion.

National team

* Belgium score given first

Key
 H = Home match
 A = Away match
 N = On neutral ground
 F = Friendly
 WCQ = World Cup qualification
 o.g. = own goal

European competitions
K Lierse SK lost in the preliminary round of the 1960–61 European Champion Clubs' Cup to FC Barcelona of Spain (loss 2-0 away and 0-3 at home). RU Saint-Gilloise lost in the first round of the 1960–61 Inter-Cities Fairs Cup to AS Roma (draw 0-0 at home and defeat 1-4 away).

Honours

Final league tables

Premier Division

 1960-61 Top scorer: Victor Wégria (RFC Liégeois) with 23 goals.
 1960 Golden Shoe: Paul Van Himst (RSC Anderlechtois)

References